William Warren Prescott (1855–1944) was an administrator, educator, and scholar in the early Seventh-day Adventist Church.

Biography 
Prescott's parents were part of the Millerite movement.

W. W. Prescott graduated from Dartmouth College in 1877 and served as principal of high schools in Vermont, and published and edited newspapers in Maine and Vermont prior to accepting the presidency of Battle Creek College (1885 to 1894). While still president of Battle Creek College he helped found Union College and became its first president in 1891. In 1892 he assumed the presidency of the newly founded Walla Walla College in Washington. Five years later, he helped found Australasian Mission College (now Avondale College) in Australia.

He was invited to tour many regions of the world (1894–1895) to hold Bible institutes and to strengthen developing educational interests. Back in the USA in 1901, he became vice-president of the General Conference of the Seventh-day Adventist church, chairman of the Review and Herald Publishing Association board (a Seventh-day Adventist church operated publishing house), and editor of the Review and Herald (a Seventh-day Adventist church religious magazine). On relinquishing this editorship in 1909, he edited the Protestant Magazine for seven years.

He was a field secretary of the General Conference from 1915 until his retirement in 1937, serving during this time as principal of the Australasian Missionary College (1922), and as head of the Bible department at Union College (1924–1928). He spent the year 1930 visiting the churches and institutions in Europe. On his return he wrote The Spade and the Bible, and then became head of the Bible department of Emmanuel Missionary College, a post he held until 1934.

Publications 

 Christ and the Sabbath (International Religious Liberty Association, 1893)
 The Doctrine of Christ: a series of Bible studies for use in colleges and seminaries (Review & Herald, 1920)
 The Saviour of the World (Review & Herald, 1929)
 The Spade and the Bible: Archaeological Discoveries Confirm the Old Book (Fleming H. Revell, 1933)
 Victory in Christ (Review & Herald, not dated)

See also 

 Seventh-day Adventist Church
 Seventh-day Adventist theology
 Seventh-day Adventist eschatology
 History of the Seventh-day Adventist Church
 Teachings of Ellen White
 Inspiration of Ellen White
 Prophecy in the Seventh-day Adventist Church
 Investigative judgment
 The Pillars of Adventism
 Second Advent
 Baptism by Immersion
 Conditional Immortality
 Historicism
 Three Angels' Messages
 End times
 Sabbath in Seventh-day Adventism
 Ellen G. White
 Adventist Review
 Adventist
 Seventh-day Adventist Church Pioneers
 Seventh-day Adventist worship

References 

* Gilbert M. Valentine, W. W. Prescott: Forgotten Giant of Adventism’s Second Generation. Review and Herald, 2005. Reworked from The Shaping of Adventism: The Case of W. W. Prescott (Andrews University Press, 1992)

External links 
 Pioneer biography
 The Prescott letter to W. C. White, April 6, 1915, comments on the circumstances by Arthur White, followed by the letter itself 
 W. W. Prescott and the 1911 edition of The Great Controversy, by Arthur White
 "The Church ‘drifting toward a crisis’: Prescott’s 1915 Letter to William White" by Gilbert Valentine. Catalyst 2:1 (November 2007), 32–94
 Manuscript Collection at Andrews University, including a brief biography online
 Articles by Prescott cataloged in the Seventh-day Adventist Periodical Index (SDAPI)

Seventh-day Adventist religious workers
1855 births
1944 deaths
Seventh-day Adventist theologians
Seventh-day Adventists from Michigan
Walla Walla University